SOMAIR (Société des Mines de l'Air) is a national mining company of Niger in the mining area of its northern zone.
Established in 1968, it started uranium mining at the Arlit deposit in 1971, mining 0.30 - 0.35% ore down to depth of  depth. By 1981, the company was producing 2100 tU/yr and by 2006 it was producing 1565 tU at the Tamou deposit. The production peaked to 3065 tU in 2012. The resources, according to the Red Book, are assessed at 23,170 tU, as of 2010, at 42,200 tU of 0.25%U grade recoverable conventionally, and 5500 tU of 0.07%U grade from heap leaching. SOMAIR is one of two national mining companies in Niger, the other being COMINAK in the nearby Akokan.

Geography

Arlit and Akokan are the twin mining towns of SOMAIR. They are situated on the southern border of the Sahara desert, where uranium is extracted, and are on the western fringe of the Aïr Mountains.

History

Discovery of uranium in Niger is dated to 1967. It was discovered at Azelik by the French Bureau de Recherches Geologiques et Minières (BRGM). Studies of its potential and quality were commenced by the French Atomic Energy Commission (CEA). Uranium deposits were also discovered in sandstone formations in other locations in Niger such as at Abokurum (1959), Madaouela (1963), Arlette, Ariege, Artois and Tassa/Taza (1965), Imouraren (1966) and Akouta (1967). In 1971, SOMAIR became the first company to operate the Arlit mine. Yet another company, the Société Minière de Tassa N'Taghalgue (SMTT) assigned its mining rights in 1996 to SOMAIR before it dissolved.

Operations
SOMAIR, like COMINAK, is a subsidiary of Areva. The company's two shareholders are Cogema (now Areva NC) and ONAREM (Office National des Ressources Minieres du Niger). The mine operations conform to the ISO 14001 certification.

Production
The extraction process was started during the late 1970s and early 1980s, and involved the building of exclusive leach pad processing operations of the extracted uranium ores, apart from open cut mining. Initially, the Artois deposits were extracted by open cut mining up to  depth with a production rate of 0.30 - 0.35% ore. Lower grade uranium are exploited up to deeper depths of ), but with lower ore extraction rate of 0.20 - 0.25%.

During 2005–06, new leach pads were constructed over the old ones. The new leach pad is capable of handling 17 million tonnes of uranium ore which could yield 1.4 million tonnes of uranium extract per year. It is built up with 5 layers of  lift each. 
High-density polyethylene (HDPE) of  thickness is laid over the clay layer. The optimized design adopted envisages minimizing the cut-and-fill earthworks and also ensure pad-drainage slopes to enable gravity drainage "through a solution channel to the ponds". The drainage pipes are perforated pipes and are installed in a "herringbone pattern", in each cell. Collection of drainage water from each cell is achieved by linking them to a collector drain pipe which carries the drained water into the processing ponds. The piping system was fully camouflaged with fill of ore material.

According to the Red Book, the resource potential of the ore was 42,200 tU as of 2010; this includes conventional recovery of 42,200 tU of 0.25%U, and by heap leaching another 5500 tU at 0.07%U. The production of the SOMAIR mines have progressively increased from 1808 tU in 2009, 2726 tU in 2011 and 3065 tU in 2012. Since 2010, the production from SOMAIR Lixi mine has been 1000 tU/yr. The mill capacity has also been upgraded to handle 3000 tU/year. This operation has an annual production rate of 1.4 Mt of low-grade ore with a yield of less than 0.1%U. The processed ore is converted into concentrates and then transported to the ports of Benin. From these ports, they are shipped to Comurhex in France.

See also
List of countries by uranium production
List of countries by uranium reserves
Oil and mining industry of Niger

References

Uranium mining companies of Niger
Non-renewable resource companies established in 1968
1968 establishments in Niger